Cold storage may refer to:

Arts and entertainment
 CoLD SToRAGE, an alias of the musician Tim Wright (born 1967)
 Cold Storage (1951 film), a 1951 animated short film starring Disney's Pluto
 The Walking Dead: Cold Storage, a 2012 4-part webisode series for The Walking Dead TV series
 Cold Storage, a 2019 science fiction novel by David Koepp.

Temperature
 Cold chain
 Freezer
 Refrigeration
 Refrigerator
 ULT freezer (ultra low temperature, −40 to −86 °C)

Other uses
 Cold storage, an offline cryptocurrency wallet
 Cold Storage Limited, original name of Frasers Property
 Cold Storage (supermarket), a supermarket found in Singapore and Malaysia

See also
 In the context of computer data storage (and  backup) the term "cold storage" is "long term storage". See also Cold data.
 Cryobiology, a branch of biology that studies the effects of low temperatures on living things
 Postponement, a business strategy which maximizes possible benefit and minimizes risk by delaying further investment